Area Code 615 was an American country rock band from Nashville, active in the late 1960s and early 1970s, taking their name from the telephone area code, which at the time covered all of Central and Eastern Tennessee. The band was made up of session musicians, recording only two albums before resuming normal session work. Several of the members were backing musicians for Bob Dylan's Blonde on Blonde and Nashville Skyline albums plus recordings by Billy Swan and The Monkees.

Their best known work was "Stone Fox Chase", which was used as the theme to the British Broadcasting Corporation's music programme The Old Grey Whistle Test.

Area Code 615 members Wayne Moss, Mac Gayden and Kenny Buttrey went on to play with Nashville-based Barefoot Jerry, while David Briggs later worked with Elvis Presley and Joan Baez. 

Their cover of "Classical Gas", from their self-titled 1969 album, is sampled and featured in Irish and UK Guinness TV commercials.

Musicians
Mac Gayden – Lead guitar, vocals
Charlie McCoy – Harmonica, vocals
Bobby Thompson – Banjo, guitar (died 2005)
Wayne Moss – Guitar, bass
Buddy Spicher – Fiddle, viola, cello
David Briggs – Keyboards
Ken Lauber – Keyboards
Norbert Putnam – Bass, cello
Kenny Buttrey – Drums (died 2004)
Weldon Myrick – Pedal steel guitar (died 2014)
Elliot Mazer – Co-producer

Discography
Area Code 615, 1969
Trip in the Country, 1970

References

Musical groups from Nashville, Tennessee
Musical groups established in 1969
Musical groups disestablished in 1971
1969 establishments in Tennessee
1971 disestablishments in Tennessee